Greg Pipes (August 4, 1946 - October 15, 2021) was a former award-winning and all-star defensive tackle in the Canadian Football League with the Edmonton Eskimos from 1968 to 1972.

A graduate of Baylor University, he was picked for the 1967 College Football All-America Team and was drafted by the Buffalo Bills of the NFL. Pipes played five seasons with the Eskimos. His best year was 1970, when he was an all-star and winner of the DeMarco-Becket Memorial Trophy as best lineman in the Western Division.

He returned to Baylor after his playing days and earned a law degree. He had a 35-year career with the District Attorney's office in Tarrant County.

Greg Pipes died on October 15, 2021, in Arlington, Texas.

References 

1946 births
Living people
Baylor Bears football players
Baylor University alumni
Canadian football defensive linemen
Edmonton Elks players
People from Fort Worth, Texas